Restaurant Gordon Ramsay, also known as Gordon Ramsay at Royal Hospital Road, is the signature restaurant owned and operated by Gordon Ramsay at Royal Hospital Road, in Chelsea, London. It opened in 1998 and was Ramsay's first solo restaurant. In 2001 it was awarded three Michelin stars, and in 2022 Ramsay celebrated 21 years with all three. In March 2013, the restaurant reopened following an art deco redesign.

Description

Gordon Ramsay opened Restaurant Gordon Ramsay in 1998, as his first solo restaurant. The location previously housed the Michelin-starred restaurant La Tante Claire.

Restaurant Gordon Ramsay gained its third Michelin star in 2001, making Ramsay the first Scottish chef to have done so. In September 2006, a £1.5 million refurbishment was completed. In 2015, Matt Abé was appointed Chef Patron.

Reception
In 2002, Giles Coren visited Restaurant Gordon Ramsay for lunch while writing for Times Online. He found that the meal had its good and bad points, saying "Perhaps the 'best restaurant in Britain' can only disappoint. Perhaps if I want magic I should wait for Paul Daniels to open a restaurant." However, he gave scores of nine for execution, eight for service, and seven for "mind-blowing tingliness". Terry Durack of The Independent reviewed the restaurant in 2009, describing the food provided as "classic cooking; sophisticated, well-edited and flavour-first". Overall he gave Restaurant Gordon Ramsay a score of 16 out of 20.

In 2009, the restaurant dropped out of the S.Pellegrino World's 50 Best Restaurants for the first time, and failed to make the top 100. The 2011 edition of Harden's restaurant guide lists Restaurant Gordon Ramsay in seventeenth place in London in the "most mentioned" league table, a drop from ninth place in the previous year. It also ranked the restaurant in one of the top two spots in the "most disappointing cooking" category. Harden's had previously listed the restaurant as the most overpriced in the UK. However, The Good Food Guide lists Restaurant Gordon Ramsay as the second-best in the country, behind the Fat Duck in Bray, Berkshire, and was described as "the nearest thing to a world-class restaurant experience" in London.

See also

 List of Michelin 3-star restaurants

References

External links
 

Restaurants in London
Michelin Guide starred restaurants in the United Kingdom
1998 establishments in England
Restaurants established in 1998
1998 in London